The Dornier Do 18 was a development of the Do 16 flying boat. It was developed for the Luftwaffe, but Luft Hansa received five aircraft and used these for tests between the Azores and the North American continent in 1936 and on their mail route over the South Atlantic from 1937 to 1939.

On 27–29 March 1938, a "Do 18 W" established a seaplane record, flying non-stop a straight distance of 8,391 km (5,214 mi) from Start Point, Devon to Caravelas in Brazil.

Design and development
In 1934, the Dornier Flugzeugwerke started development of a new twin-engine flying boat to replace the Dornier Do J "Wal" (Whale) in both military and civil roles. The resultant design, Do 18, retained the layout of the Wal, with a metal hull fitted with distinctive stabilising sponsons, and powered by two engines above the wing in a push-pull layout, but was aerodynamically and hydrodynamically more efficient. It was planned to be powered by two of the new Junkers Jumo 205 Diesel engines. Although heavy, these promised to give much lower fuel consumption than conventional petrol engines of similar power.

The first prototype, the Do 18a, registration D-AHIS (and named Monsun by Luft Hansa) flew on 15 March 1935, powered by two of the earlier 410 kW (550 hp) Junkers Jumo 5c Diesels as the planned Jumo 205s were not yet available. It was lost on 2 November 1935 over the Baltic Sea during high-speed tests. Three further prototypes followed, two (the Do 18d and Do 18b) being prototype military aircraft, and the Do 18c (later redesignated Do 18 V3), a civil prototype.

The Do 18c was delivered to Luft Hansa as a Do 18E civil transport (D-ABYM Aeolus), quickly followed by a further two aircraft, (D-AANE Zyklon and D-ARUN Zephir) with a final Do 18E (D-AROZ Pampero) being built in 1938.

A further civil Do 18 was the Do 18F, a modified aircraft with longer wingspan and higher weights built for extended-range flights. The sole Do 18F, D-ANHR, first flew on 11 June 1937. It was later modified with 656 kW (880 hp) BMW 132N radial engines to test a possible upgrade for the Luftwaffe's aircraft, flying in this form on 21 November 1939 as the Do 18L. It suffered cooling problems, however, and further development of the radial powered Do 18 was abandoned.

Operational history

Civil service
In 1936, Luft Hansa started a series of endurance trials, culminating on 10–11 September when Zephir, flown by Flugkapitän Blankenburg with Luft Hansa Director Freiherr von Gablenz as passenger, was launched by catapult from the seaplane tender Schwabenland at Horta, Azores, flying the 4,460 km (2,270 mi) to New York City in 22 hours 12 minutes. Also on 11 September, Aeolus flew from Horta to Hamilton, Bermuda in 18 hours 15 minutes, continuing to New York the next day. For the main leg of the North Atlantic the aircraft needed the help of the catapult on Schwabenland. On 22 September Aeolus returned to Horta in 17:50 h (3850 km). Zephir was catapulted on 28 September at Hamilton. Further flights to New York followed on 5–6 and 6–7 October and the return flights this time, 17 and 18 October from Sydney, Nova Scotia. The flying boats did not wait for their tender and went on to Lisbon and Travemünde.

In April 1937, D-ARUN Zephir and D-ABYM Aeolus started service on the South Atlantic mail route from Bathurst, now Banjul, Gambia to Natal, Brazil (3040 km). Catapult ships were based in Bathurst and Fernando de Noronha to allow the aircraft to cross the Atlantic carrying a full load of mail.

In June they were joined by V6 D-AROZ Pampero. Aeolus was lost on 30 July 1937, when it had to make an ocean landing due to engine problems and was heavily damaged when Ostmark tried to retrieve the plane. Pampero (20 August) and Zephir (29 January 1938) also had to make ocean landings. Pampero was lost at sea nearly without trace on 1 October 1938 with a crew of five.

Luft Hansas fifth aircraft was the only Do 18F V7 D-ANNE Zyklon, that first took to the skies on 11 June 1937. This was the only Do 18 with a wider span, which enabled it to stay in the air with one engine out. This was a special demand of Luft Hansa. Zyklon was used over the South Atlantic between September 1937 and March 1939. The Do 18s crossed the South Atlantic 73 times.

Zyklon is not the aircraft that established the England to Brazil distance record from 27–29 March 1938 as often stated.
The record-setting aircraft D-ANHR was taken from the military production line and was specially prepared. It was flown as a builder's machine with a Luft Hansa crew augmented by the works pilot Gundermann. On the way back to the South American station the seaplane tender Westfalen took the aircraft into the English Channel where it was catapulted to Brazil. On the record flight the conditions were not optimal and the Do 18 did not reach Rio de Janeiro as planned.

Military use
In Luftwaffe service, it was obsolete by the outbreak of World War II, but, as the only military flying boat, 62 (58 serviceable) in five squadrons were in use mainly on North Sea reconnaissance missions. In 1940 some squadrons changed their base to Norway. The vulnerable and underpowered flying boat was soon relegated to training and the air/sea rescue role. In the middle of 1941, only one squadron was still operational on Do 18. The Blohm & Voss BV 138 had superseded the Dornier.

The flying boat was able to make an emergency landing but was sunk by the destroyer .

Variants

Civil variants
Do 18E
Initial civil version, powered by 410 kW (550 hp) Jumo 205C-1 engines. Four built.
Do 18F
Long range civil version V7 D-ANNE Zyklon, with extended-span (26.30 m (86 ft 3 in)) wings and increased take-off weight. One built.
Do 18L
The record-aircraft D-ANHR modified with BMW 132M radials. One converted.

Military variants
The Do 18D 79 built, was the first military version, powered by two 450 kW (600 hp) Jumo 205C engines, armed with one 7.92 mm (0.312 in) MG 15 machine gun in the bow and dorsal positions.
The Do 18G 62 built, was an improved version, powered by two 656 kW (880 hp) Jumo 205D engines, armed with a 13 mm (0.51 in) MG 131 machine gun in the bow, and a 20 mm MG 151 cannon in a power-operated dorsal turret. This version had an altered bow contour and broader sponsons
The Do 18H 22 built (+ conversions ?) was an unarmed dual-control training version.
The Do 18N was a designation for unarmed air-sea search and rescue conversions.
Including the civilian flying boats 170 Dornier Do 18 were built by Dornier in Manzell (48 until March 1939) and Weser Flugzeugbau in Einswarden and Nordenham (122 until August 1940).

Operators

Deutsche Luft Hansa
Luftwaffe

Specifications (Do 18D-1)

See also

References

Bibliography

 
 
 
 
 

Do 018
1930s German airliners
1930s German patrol aircraft
Diesel-engined aircraft
Twin-engined push-pull aircraft
Flying boats
World War II patrol aircraft of Germany
Parasol-wing aircraft
Aircraft first flown in 1935